Shtokavian or Štokavian (/) is the prestige supradialect of the pluricentric Serbo-Croatian language and the basis of its Serbian, Croatian, Bosnian and Montenegrin standards. It is a part of the South Slavic dialect continuum. This is in contrast to Kajkavian and Chakavian ( and  also meaning "what").

Shtokavian is spoken in Serbia, Montenegro, Bosnia and Herzegovina, much of Croatia, as well as the southern part of Austria's Burgenland. The primary subdivisions of Shtokavian are based on three principles: one is different accents whether the subdialect is Old-Shtokavian or Neo-Shtokavian, second is the way the old Slavic phoneme jat has changed (Ikavian, Ijekavian or Ekavian), and third is presence of Young Proto-Slavic isogloss (Schakavian or Shtakavian). Modern dialectology generally recognises seven Shtokavian subdialects.

Early history of Shtokavian

The early medieval Slavs who later spoke various Bulgarian and Serbo-Croatian dialects migrated across Moldavia and Pannonia. According to Frederik Kortlandt, the shared innovations originate from "Trans-Carphatian" homeland, and by the 4th and 6th century, "the major dialect divisions of Slavic were already established". Dialectologists and Slavists maintain that when the separation of Western South Slavic speeches happened, they separated into five divergent groups, more specifically two, one Slovene and second Serbo-Croatian with four divergent groups - Kajkavian, Chakavian, Western Shtokavian and Eastern Shtokavian. The latter group can be additionally divided into first (Kajkavian, Chakavian, Western Shtokavian) and second (Eastern Shtokavian, Torlakian). As noted by Ranko Matasović, "the Shtokavian dialect, on the other hand, was from the earliest times very non-unique, with the Western Shtokavian dialects leaning towards Kajkavian, and the Eastern Shtokavian to Torlakian". According to isoglosses, and presumed end of existence of the Southwestern Slavic around the 8th-9th century, the formation of the Proto-Western Shtokavian and Proto-Eastern Shtokavian linguistic and territorial unit would be around the 9th-10th century (Proto-Western Shtokavian closer to Proto-Chakavian, while Proto-Eastern Shtokavian shared old isogloss with Bulgarian). According to Ivo Banac in the area of today's Slavonia, Bosnia and Herzegovina (west of Brčko, Vlasenica and Neretva line) and on the littoral between Bay of Kotor and Cetina medieval Croats spoke old West Shtokavian dialect, for which some believe that occurs from the Chakavian, while medieval Serbs spoke two dialects, old East Shtokavian and Torlakian. Many linguists noted close connection between Chakavian and Western Shtokavian, for example Pavle Ivić saw Chakavian as arhaic peripheral zone of Shtokavian, while Dalibor Brozović derived majority of Chakavian dialects from the same accentological core as Western Shtokavian. Western Shtokavian was principally characterized by a three-accent system, whereas Eastern Shtokavian was mostly marked by a two-accent system.

Western Shtokavian covered the major part of present-day Bosnia and Herzegovina, Slavonia and part of Southern Dalmatia in Croatia. Eastern Shtokavian was dominant in Serbia, easternmost Bosnia and Herzegovina and greater parts of Montenegro. From the 12th century, both dialects started separating further from Chakavian and Kajkavian idioms. According to research of historical linguistics, Old-Shtokavian was well established by the mid-15th century. In this period it was still mixed with Church Slavonic to varying degrees. However, the ultimate development of Western Shtokavian and Eastern Shtokavian was not divergent (like in the case of Chakavian and Kajkavian), but convergent. It was the result of migrations (particularly of Neoshtokavian-Eastern Shtokavian speakers), political-cultural border change and else caused by Ottoman invasion (since 16th century). Initially two separate proto-idioms started to resemble each other so greatly that, according to Brozović (1975), "[today] we can no longer speak of an independent Western Shtokavian, but only about the better or weaker preservation of former West Shtokavian features in some dialects of the unique Shtokavian group of dialects".

As can be seen from the image on the right, originally the Shtokavian dialect covered a significantly smaller area than it covers today, meaning that the Shtokavian speech has spread for the last five centuries, overwhelmingly at the expense of Chakavian and Kajkavian idioms. Modern areal distribution of these three dialects as well as their internal stratification (Shtokavian and Chakavian in particular) is primarily a result of the migrations resulting from the spread of Ottoman Empire in the Balkans. Migratory waves were particularly strong in the 16th–18th century, bringing about large-scale linguistic and ethnic changes on the Central South Slavic area (see also Great Serb Migrations).

By far the most numerous, mobile and expansionist migrations were those of Ijekavian-Shtokavian speakers of eastern Herzegovina, who have spread into most of Western Serbia, many areas of eastern and western Bosnia, large swathes of Croatia (Banovina, Kordun, Lika, parts of Gorski kotar, continental parts of northern Dalmatia, some places north of Kupa, parts of Slavonia, southeastern Baranya etc.). This is the reason Eastern Herzegovinian is the most spoken Serbo-Croatian dialect today, and why it bears the name that is only descriptive of its area of origin. These migrations also played the pivotal role in the spread of Neo-Shtokavian innovations.

Earliest texts of Shtokavian dialect
Proto-Shtokavian, or Church Slavic with ingredients of nascent Shtokavian, were recorded in legal documents like the charter of Ban Kulin, regulating the commerce between Bosnia and Dubrovnik in Croatia, dated 1189, and in liturgical texts like Gršković's and Mihanović's fragments, ca. 1150, in southern Bosnia or Herzegovina. Experts' opinions are divided with regard to the extent these texts, especially the Kulin ban parchment, contain contemporary Shtokavian vernacular. Mainly Shtokavian, with ingredients of Church Slavic, are numerous legal and commercial documents from pre-Ottoman Bosnia, Hum, Serbia, Zeta, and southern Dalmatia, especially Dubrovnik. The first major comprehensive vernacular Shtokavian text is the Vatican Croatian Prayer Book, written in Dubrovnik a decade or two before 1400. In the next two centuries Shtokavian vernacular texts had been written mainly in Dubrovnik, other Adriatic cities and islands influenced by Dubrovnik, as well as in Bosnia, by Bosnian Franciscans and Bosniak Muslim vernacular alhamiado literature – the first example being "Chirvat-türkisi" or "Croatian song", dated 1589.

Relationship towards neighboring dialects
Shtokavian is characterized by a number of characteristic historical sound changes, accentual changes, changes in inflection, morphology and syntax. Some of these isoglosses are not exclusive and have also been shared by neighboring dialects, and some of them have mostly but not completely spread over the whole Shtokavian area. The differences between Shtokavian and the unrelated, neighboring Bulgarian–Macedonian dialects are mostly clear-cut, whereas the differences with the related Serbo-Croatian dialects of Chakavian and Kajkavian are much more fluid, and the mutual influence of various subdialects plays a more prominent role.

The main bundle of isoglosses separates Slovenian and Kajkavian on the one hand from Shtokavian and Chakavian on the other. These are:
 long falling accent of newer origin (neocircumflex)
 development of the consonant group rj (as opposed to consonant /r/) from former soft /r'/ before a vowel (e.g.)
 reflexes of /o/ or /ọ/ of the old Common Slavic nasal vowel /ǫ/, and not /u/
 inflectional morpheme -o (as opposed to -ojo) in the instrumental singular of a-declension

Other characteristics distinguishing Kajkavian from Shtokavian, beside the demonstrative/interrogatory pronoun kaj (as opposed to što/šta used in Shtokavian), are:
 a reflex of old semivowels of /ẹ/ (e.g. dẹn < Common Slavic *dьnь, pẹs < Common Slavic *pьsъ); closed /ẹ/ appearing also as a jat reflex
 retention of word-final -l (e.g. , as opposed to Shtokavian došao)
 word-initial u- becoming v- (e.g. ,)
 dephonemicization of affricates /č/ and /ć/ to some form of middle value
 genitive plural of masculine nouns has the morpheme -of / -ef
 syncretized dative, locative and instrumental plural has the ending -ami
 the ending -me in the first-person plural present (e.g. vidime)
 affix š in the formation of adjectival comparatives (e.g. debleši, slabeši)
 supine
 future tense formation in the form of bom/bum došel, došla, došlo

Characteristics distinguishing Chakavian from Shtokavian, beside the demonstrative/interrogatory pronoun ča, are:
 preservation of polytonic three-accent system
 vocalization of weak jers in word-initial syllables (e.g. malin/melin < Common Slavic *mъlinъ; cf. Shtokavian mlin)
 vowel /a/ as opposed to /e/ after palatal consonants /j/, /č/, /ž/ (e.g. Čk. jazik/zajik : Št. jezik, Čk. počati : Št. početi, Čk. žaja : Št. želja)
 the appearance of extremely palatal /t'/ or /ć'/ (< earlier /t'/) and /j/ (< earlier /d'/) either in free positions or in groups št', žd'
 depalatalization of /n'/ and /l'/
 /ž/ instead of /dʒ/ (c.f. Čk. žep : Št. džep)
 /č/ > /š/ before consonants (c.f. Čk. maška : Št. mačka)
 word-initial consonant groups čr-, čri-, čre- (c.f. Čk. črivo/črevo : Št. cr(ij)evo, Čk. črn : Št. crn)
 conditional mood with biš in the second-person singular
 non-syncretized dative, locative and instrumental plural

General characteristics
General characteristics of Shtokavian are the following:

 što or šta as the demonstrative/interrogative pronoun
 differentiation between two short (in addition to two or three long) accents, rising and falling, though not in all Shtokavian speakers
 preservation of unaccented length, but not consistently across all speeches
 /u/ as the reflex of Common Slavic back nasal vowel /ǫ/ as well as the syllabic /l/ (with the exception of central Bosnia where a diphthongal /uo/ is also recorded as a reflex)
 initial group of v- + weak semivowel yields u- (e.g. unuk < Common Slavic *vъnukъ)
 schwa resulting from the jer merger yields /a/, with the exception of the Zeta-Raška dialect
 metathesis of vьse to sve
 čr- > cr-, with the exception of Slavonian, Molise and Vlah oasis-Burgenland dialect
 word-final -l changes to /o/ or /a/; the exception is the verbal adjective in the Slavonian southwest
 ď > /dʑ/  with numerous exceptions
 cr > tr in the word trešnja "cherry"; some exceptions in Slavonia, Hungary and Romania
 ć and đ from jt, jd (e.g. poći, pođem); exceptions in Slavonian and Eastern Bosnian dialect
 so-called "new iotation" of dentals and labials, with many exceptions, especially in Slavonia and Bosnia
 general loss of phoneme /x/, with many exceptions
 ending -ā in genitive plural of masculine and feminine nouns, with many exceptions
 ending -u in locative singular of masculine and neuter nouns (e.g.)
 augment -ov- / -ev- in the plural of most monosyllabic masculine nouns, with many exceptions (e.g. in the area between Neretva and Dubrovnik)
 syncretism of dative, locative and instrumental plural of nouns, with many exceptions
 preservation of ending  in genitive and accusative singular of masculine and neuter gender if pronominal-adjectival declension (e.g.), with exceptions on the area of Dubrovnik and Livno
 special form with the ending -a for the neuter gender in nominative plural of pronominal-adjectival declension (e.g.  and no )
 preservation of aorist, which is however missing in some areas (e.g., around Dubrovnik)
 special constructs reflecting old dual for numerals 2–4 (dva, tri, četiri stola)
 many so-called "Turkisms" (turcizmi) or "Orientalisms", i.e. words borrowed from Ottoman Turkish

As can be seen from the list, many of this isoglosses are missing from particular Shtokavian idioms, just as many of them are shared with neighboring non-Shtokavian dialects.

There exist three main criteria for the division of Shtokavian dialects:
 Accentuation ("Old-Shtokavian" and "Neo-Shtokavian"; see section below)
 Yat reflex ("Ikavian", "Ijekavian", "Ekavian"; see section below)
 Young Proto-Slavic (600–750 AD) palatal consonant isogloss: *šć-*žƷ ( - Schakavian; "Western Shtokavian" including Slavonian, Eastern Bosnian and transitory Western ikavian dialect) and *št & *žd ( - Shtakavian; "Eastern Shtokavian" including Eastern Herzegovinian-Krajina, Šumadija-Vojvodina, Kosovo-Resava, Zeta-Raška dialect). The isogloss developed between 7th and 8/9th century, and the former relates those dialects with Chakavian and Kajkavian, while the latter relates those dialects with Bulgarian.

Accentuation 
The Shtokavian dialect is divided into Old-Shtokavian and Neo-Shtokavian subdialects. The primary distinction is the accentuation system: although there are variations, "old" dialects preserve the older accent system, which consists of two types of falling (dynamic) accents, one long and one short, and unstressed syllables, which can be long and short. Both long and short unstressed syllables could precede the stressed syllables. Stress placement is free and mobile in paradigms.

In the process known as "Neo-Shtokavian metatony" or "retraction", length of the old syllables was preserved, but their quality changed. Stress (intensity) on the inner syllables moved to the preceding syllable, but they kept the high pitch. That process produced the "rising" accents characteristic for Neo-Shtokavian, and yielded the modern four-tone system. Stress on the initial syllables remained the same in quality and pitch.

Most speakers of Shtokavian, native or taught, from Serbia and Croatia do not distinguish between short rising and short falling tones. They also pronounce most unstressed long vowels as short, with some exceptions, such as genitive plural endings.

The following notation is used for Shtokavian accents:

The following table shows the examples of Neo-Shtokavian retraction:

As result of this process, the following set of rules emerged, which are still in effect in all standard variants of Serbo-Croatian:
 Falling accents may only occur word-initially (otherwise it would have been retracted).
 Rising accents may occur anywhere except word-finally.
 thus, monosyllabic words may only have falling accent.
 Unstressed length may only appear after a stressed syllable.

In practice, influx of foreign words and formation of compound words have loosened these rules, especially in spoken idioms (e.g. paradȁjz, asistȅnt, poljoprȉvreda), but they are maintained in standard language and dictionaries.

Classification

Old-Shtokavian dialects

Timok–Prizren (Torlakian)

The transitional dialects stretch southwest from the Timok Valley near the Bulgarian border to Prizren. There is disagreement among linguists whether these dialects belong to the Shtokavian area, because there are many other morphological characteristics apart from rendering of što (also, some dialects use kakvo or kvo, typical for Bulgarian), which would place them into a "transitional" group between Shtokavian and Eastern South Slavic languages (Bulgarian and Macedonian). The Timok-Prizren group falls to the Balkan language area: declension has all but disappeared, the infinitive has yielded to subjunctives da-constructions, and adjectives are compared exclusively with prefixes. The accent in the dialect group is a stress accent, and it falls on any syllable in the word. The old semi-vowel has been retained throughout. The vocalic l has been retained (vlk = vuk), and some dialects don't distinguish ć/č and đ/dž by preferring the latter, postalveolar variants. Some subdialects preserve l at the end of words (where otherwise it has developed into a short o) – došl, znal, etc. (cf. Kajkavian and Bulgarian); in others, this l has become the syllable ja.

Torlakian is spoken in Metohija, around Prizren, Gnjilane and Štrpce especially, in Southern Serbia around Bujanovac, Vranje, Leskovac, Niš, Aleksinac, in the part of Toplica Valley around Prokuplje, in Eastern Serbia around Pirot, Svrljig, Soko Banja, Boljevac, Knjaževac ending up with the area around Zaječar, where the Kosovo-Resava dialect becomes more dominant. It has been recorded several exclaves with Torlakian speeches inside Kosovo-Resava dialect area. One is the most prominent and preserved, like village Dublje near Svilajnac, where the majority of settlers came from Torlakian speaking village Veliki Izvor near Zajecar. Few centuries ago, before settlers from Kosovo and Metohija brought Kosovo-Resava speeches to Eastern Serbia (to Bor and Negotin area), Torlakian speech had been overwhelmingly represented in this region.

Slavonian

Also called the Archaic Šćakavian, it is spoken by Croats who live in some parts of Slavonia, Bačka, Baranja, Syrmia, in Croatia and Vojvodina, as well as in northern Bosnia. It is divided into two subdialects: southern (Posavian / posavski) and northern (Podravian / podravski). The Slavonian dialect has mixed Ikavian and Ekavian pronunciations. Ikavian accent is predominant in the Posavina, Baranja, Bačka, and in the Slavonian subdialect enclave of Derventa, whereas Ekavian accent is predominant in Podravina. There are enclaves of one accent in the territory of the other, as well as mixed Ekavian–Ikavian and Jekavian–Ikavian areas. In some villages in Hungary, the original yat is preserved. Local variants can widely differ in the degree of Neo-Shtokavian influences. In two villages in Posavina, Siče and Magića Male, the l, as in the verb nosil, has been retained in place of the modern nosio. In some villages in the Podravina, čr is preserved instead of the usual cr, for example in črn instead of crn. Both forms are usual in Kajkavian but very rare in Shtokavian.

East Bosnian

Also called Jekavian-Šćakavian, or Central/Middle Bosnian because has misleading name (not located in geographically true Eastern Bosnia in Podrinje where's spoken Eastern Herzegovinian dialect). It is a base for the Bosnian language. It has Jekavian pronunciations in the vast majority of local forms and it is spoken by the majority of Bosniaks living in that area, which includes the bigger Bosnian cities Sarajevo, Tuzla, and Zenica, and by most of Croats and Serbs that live in that area (Vareš, Usora, etc.). Together with basic Jekavian pronunciation, mixed pronunciations exist in Tešanj and Maglaj dete–djeteta (Ekavian–Jekavian) and around Žepče and Jablanica djete–diteta (Jekavian–ikavian).

Zeta–Raška

Also known as Đekavian-Ijekavian, it is spoken in eastern Montenegro, in Podgorica and Cetinje, around the city of Novi Pazar in eastern Raška in Serbia, and by descendants of Montenegrin settlers in the single village of Peroj in Istria. The majority of its speakers are Serbs and Montenegrins and Muslims from Serbia and Montenegro. Together with the dominant Jekavian pronunciation, mixed pronunciations like djete–deteta (Jekavian–Ekavian) around Novi Pazar and Bijelo Polje, dite–đeteta (Ikavian–Jekavian) around Podgorica and dete–đeteta (Ekavian–Jekavian) in the village of Mrkojevići in southern Montenegro. Mrkojevići are also characterised by retention of čr instead of cr as in the previously mentioned villages in Podravina.

Some vernaculars have a very open /ɛ/ or /æ/ as their reflex of ь/ъ, very rare in other Shtokavian vernaculars (sæn and dæn instead of san and dan). Other phonetic features include sounds like  in iʑesti instead of izjesti,  as in ɕekira instead of sjekira. However these sounds are known also to many in East Herzegovina like those in Konavle, and are not Zeta–Raška specific . There is a loss of the /v/ sound apparent, seen in čo'ek or đa'ola. The loss of distinction between /ʎ/ and /l/ in some vernaculars is based on a substratum. The word  is a hypercorrection (instead of ) because many vernaculars have changed lj to j.

All verbs in infinitive finish with "t" (example:  'sing'). This feature is also present in most vernaculars of East Herzegovinian, and actually almost all Serbian and Croatian vernaculars.

The group a + o gave ā /aː/ (kā instead of kao, rekā for rekao), like in other seaside vernaculars. Elsewhere, more common is ao > ō.

Kosovo–Resava

Also called Older Ekavian, is spoken by Serbs, mostly in western and northeastern Kosovo (Kosovo Valley with Kosovska Mitrovica and also around Peć), in Ibar Valley with Kraljevo, around Kruševac, Trstenik and in Župa, in the part of Toplica Valley (Kuršumlija) in the Morava Valley (Jagodina, Ćuprija, Paraćin, Lapovo), in Resava Valley (Svilajnac, Despotovac) and northeastern Serbia (Smederevo, Požarevac, Bor, Majdanpek, Negotin, Velika Plana) with one part of Banat (around Kovin, Bela Crkva and Vršac). This dialect can be also found in parts of Banatska Klisura (Clisura Dunării) in Romania, in places where Romanian Serbs live (left bank of the Danube).

Substitution of jat is predominantly Ekavian accent even on the end of datives (žene instead of ženi), in pronouns (teh instead of tih), in comparatives (dobrej instead of ) in the negative of biti (nesam instead of nisam); in Smederevo–Vršac dialects, Ikavian forms can be found (di si instead of gde si?). Smederevo–Vršac dialect (spoken in northeastern Šumadija, Lower Great Morava Valley and Banat) is sometimes classified as a subdialect of the Kosovo-Resava dialect but is also considered to be a separate dialect as it the represents mixed speech of Šumadija–Vojvodina and Kosovo–Resava dialects.

Neo-Shtokavian dialects

Bosnian–Dalmatian

Also called Bosnian–Dalmatian or Younger Ikavian. The majority of its speakers are Croats who live in Lika, Kvarner, Dalmatia, Herzegovina, and of north Bačka, around Subotica, in Serbia. The minority speakers of it include Bosniaks in western Bosnia, mostly around the city of Bihać, and also in central Bosnia where Croats and Bosniaks (e.g. Travnik, Jajce, Bugojno, Vitez) used to speak this dialect. Exclusively Ikavian accent, Bosnian and Herzegovinian forms use o in verb participle, whereas those in Dalmatia and Lika use -ija or ia like in vidija/vidia. Local form of Bačka was proposed as the base for the Bunjevac dialect of Bunjevac Croats (Bunjevci) in Vojvodina, Serbia.

Dubrovnik

Also known as Western Ijekavian, in earlier centuries, this subdialect was the independent subdialect of Western Shtokavian dialect. It is spoken by Croats and Serbs who live in some parts of Dubrovnik area. The Dubrovnik dialect has mixed Jekavian and Ikavian pronunciations or mixed Shtokavian and Chakavian vocabulary. Some vocabulary from Dalmatian, older Venetian and modern Italian are also present. It is a base for the Croatian language. The dialect today is considered to be a part of East Herzegovina subdialect because it is similar to it. It retained certain unique features that distinguish it from the original East Herzegovina subdialect.

Šumadija–Vojvodina

Also known as Younger Ekavian, is one of the bases for the standard Serbian language. It is spoken by Serbs across most of Vojvodina (excluding easternmost parts around Vršac), northern part of western Serbia, around Kragujevac and Valjevo in Šumadija, in Mačva around Šabac and Bogatić, in Belgrade and in predominantly ethnically Serbian villages in eastern Croatia around the town of Vukovar. It is predominately Ekavian (Ikavian forms are of morphophonological origin). In some parts of Vojvodina the old declension is preserved. Most Vojvodina dialects and some dialects in Šumadija have an open e and o. However the vernaculars of western Serbia, and in past to them connected vernaculars of (old) Belgrade and southwestern Banat (Borča, Pančevo, Bavanište) are as close to the standard as a vernacular can be. The dialect presents a base for the Ekavian variant of the Serbian standard language.

Eastern Herzegovinian

Also called Eastern Herzegovinian or Neo-Ijekavian. It encompasses by far the largest area and the number of speakers of all Shtokavian dialects. It is the dialectal basis of the standard literary Croatian, Bosnian, Serbian, and Montenegrin languages.

Micro groups:
 western Montenegro – spoken south Ijekavian variant.
 Croats western Ijekavian variant micro groups in region Slavonia, Banovina, Kordun, Žumberak, Neretva, East Herzegovina (Ravno, Stolac, Buna, Neum), around of region Dubrovnik, and is the basis of the Croatian standard. City: (Osijek, Bjelovar, Daruvar, Sisak, Pakrac, Petrinja, Dubrovnik, Metković).
 Serbs east Ijekavian variant groups; East Bosnia, East Herzegovina (Trebinje, Nevesinje, Bileća), Bosnian Krajina, western Serbia and Podrinje (Užice, Čačak, Ivanjica, Loznica, Priboj, Prijepolje ) and minority Croatian Serbs. City: Trebinje, Bijeljina, Banja Luka, Nevesinje, Pale.
Local forms in the Žumberak enclave and around Dubrovnik or Slunj have some special Croatian features, influenced from Chakavian and the western subdialect, whereas forms in Bjelovar or Pakrac are influenced from Kajkavian.

Yat reflexes

The Proto-Slavic vowel jat (ѣ in Cyrillic or ě in Latin)
has changed over time, coming to be pronounced differently in different areas. These different reflexes define three "pronunciations" of Shtokavian:
 In Ekavian pronunciation (ekavski ), jat has conflated into the vowel e
 in Ikavian pronunciation (ikavski ), it has conflated into the vowel i
 in Ijekavian or Jekavian pronunciation (ijekavski  or jekavski ), it has come to be pronounced ije or je, depending on whether the vowel was long or short.

Historically, the yat reflexes had been inscribed in Church Slavic texts before the significant development of Shtokavian dialect, reflecting the beginnings of the formative period of the vernacular. In early documents it is predominantly Church Slavic of the Serbian or Croatian recension (variant). The first undoubted Ekavian reflex ( 'it was') is found in a document from Serbia dated 1289; the first Ikavian reflex ( 'witnesses') in Bosnia in 1331; and first Ijekavian reflex ( 'we wish', a "hyper-Ijekavism") in Croatia in 1399. Partial attestation can be found in earlier texts (for instance, Ikavian pronunciation is found in a few Bosnian documents from the latter half of the 13th century), but philologists generally accept the aforementioned dates. In the second half of the 20th century, many vernaculars with unsubstituted yat are found. The intrusion of the vernacular into Church Slavic grew in time, to be finally replaced by the vernacular idiom. This process took place for Croats, Serbs and Bosniaks independently and without mutual interference until the mid-19th century. Historical linguistics, textual analysis and dialectology have dispelled myths about allegedly "unspoilt" vernacular speech of rural areas: for instance, it is established that Bosniaks have retained phoneme "h" in numerous words (unlike Serbs and Croats), due to elementary religious education based on the Quran, where this phoneme is the carrier of specific semantic value.

The Ekavian pronunciation, sometimes called Eastern, is spoken primarily in Serbia, and in small parts of Croatia. The Ikavian pronunciation, sometimes called Western, is spoken in western and central Bosnia, western Herzegovina, some of Slavonia and the major part of Dalmatia in Croatia. The Ijekavian pronunciation, sometimes called Southern, is spoken in central Croatia, most of Slavonia, southern Dalmatia, most of Bosnia, Herzegovina, Montenegro, as well as some parts of western Serbia. The following are some generic examples:

Long ije is pronounced as a single syllable, by many Ijekavian speakers, especially in Croatia. However, in Zeta dialect and most of East Herzegovina dialect, it is pronounced as two syllables, which is the Croatian official standard too, but seldom actually practiced. This distinction can be clearly heard in first verses of national anthems of Croatia and Montenegro—they're sung as "L'je-pa [two syllables] na-ša do-mo-vi-no" and "Oj svi-je-tla [three syllables] maj-ska zo-ro" respectively.

The Ikavian pronunciation is the only one that is not part of any standard variety of Serbo-Croatian today, though it was a variant used for a significant literary output between the 15th and 18th centuries. This has led to a reduction in its use and an increase in the use of Ijekavian in traditionally Ikavian areas since the standardization. For example, most people in formerly fully Ikavian Split, Croatia today use both Ikavian and Ijekavian words in everyday speech, without a clearly predictable pattern (usually more emotionally charged or intimate words are Ikavian and more academic, political, generally standardised words Ijekavian, but it is not a straight out rule).

Ethnic affiliation of native speakers of Shtokavian dialect
During the first half of the 19th century, protagonists of nascent Slavic philology were, as far as South Slavic dialects were concerned, embroiled in frequently bitter polemic about "ethnic affiliation" of native speakers of various dialects. This, from contemporary point of view, rather bizarre obsession was motivated primarily by political and national interests that prompted philologists-turned-ideologues to express their views on the subject. The most prominent contenders in the squabble, with conflicting agenda, were the Czech philologist Josef Dobrovský, the Slovak Pavel Šafárik, the Slovenes Jernej Kopitar and Franz Miklosich, the Serb Vuk Karadžić, the Croat of Slovak origin Bogoslav Šulek, and the Croatians Vatroslav Jagić and Ante Starčević.

The dispute was primarily concerned with who can, philologically, be labelled as "Slovene", "Croat" and "Serb" with the aim of expanding one's national territory and influence. Born in the climate of romanticism and national awakening, these polemical battles led to increased tensions between the aforementioned nations, especially because the Shtokavian dialect cannot be split along ethnic lines in an unequivocal manner.

However, contemporary native speakers, after process of national crystallization and identification had been completed, can be roughly identified as predominant speakers of various Shtokavian subdialects. Because standard languages propagated through media have strongly influenced and altered the situation in the 19th century, the following attribution must be treated with necessary caution.

The distribution of Old-Shtokavian speakers along ethnic lines in present times is as follows:
 Timok-Prizren (Ekavian accent) dialect: Serbian
 Kosovo-Resava (Ekavian accent) dialect: Serbian
 Zeta-Raška dialect (Ijekavian accent): Montenegrin, Bosniak and Serbian.
 Slavonian dialect (fluctuating "yat": mainly Ikavian accent, also Ijekavian and Ekavian): vastly Croatian
 Eastern Bosnian dialect (Ijekavian accent): Bosniak and Croatian

Generally, the Neo-Shtokavian dialect is divided as follows with regard to the ethnicity of its native speakers:
 Šumadija-Vojvodina dialect (Ekavian accent): Serbian
 Dalmatian-Bosnian dialect (Ikavian accent): Croatian and Bosniak
 Eastern Herzegovinian (Ijekavian accent): Serbian, Montenegrin, Croatian and Bosniak

Standard language
The standard Bosnian, Croatian, Montenegrin, and Serbian variants of the pluricentric Serbo-Croatian standard language are all based on the Neo-Shtokavian dialect.

However, it must be stressed that standard variants, irrespectively of their mutual differences, have been stylised in such manners that parts of the Neo-Shtokavian dialect have been retained—for instance, declension—but other features were purposely omitted or altered—for instance, the phoneme "h" was reinstated in the standard language.

Croatian has had a long tradition of Shtokavian vernacular literacy and literature. It took almost four and half centuries for Shtokavian to prevail as the dialectal basis for the Croatian standard. In other periods, Chakavian and Kajkavian dialects, as well as hybrid Chakavian–Kajkavian–Shtokavian interdialects "contended" for the Croatian national koine – but eventually lost, mainly due to historical and political reasons. By the 1650s it was fairly obvious that Shtokavian would become the dialectal basis for the Croatian standard, but this process was finally completed in the 1850s, when Neo-Shtokavian Ijekavian, based mainly on Ragusan (Dubrovnik), Dalmatian, Bosnian, and Slavonian literary heritage became the national standard language.

Serbian was much faster in standardisation. Although vernacular literature was present in the 18th century, it was Vuk Karadžić who, between 1818 and 1851, made a radical break with the past and established Serbian Neo-Shtokavian folklore idiom as the basis of standard Serbian (until then, educated Serbs had been using Serbian Slavic, Russian Slavic and hybrid Russian–Serbian language). Although he wrote in Serbian Ijekavian accent, the majority of Serbs have adopted Ekavian accent, which is dominant in Serbia. Serbs in Croatia and Bosnia, as well as Montenegrins, use the Ijekavian accent.

Bosnian is only currently beginning to take shape. The Bosniak idiom can be seen as a transition between Serbian Ijekavian and Croatian varieties, with some specific traits. After the collapse of Yugoslavia, Bosniaks affirmed their wish to stylize their own standard language, based on the Neo-Shtokavian dialect, but reflecting their characteristics—from phonetics to semantics.

Also, the contemporary situation is unstable with regard to the accentuation, because phoneticians have observed that the 4-accents speech has, in all likelihood, shown to be increasingly unstable, which resulted in proposals that a 3-accents norm be prescribed. This is particularly true for Croatian, where, contrary to all expectations, the influence of Chakavian and Kajkavian dialects on the standard language has been waxing, not waning, in the past 50–70 years.

The Croatian, Serbian, and Bosnian standard variants, although all based on the East Herzegovinian subdialect of Neo-Shtokavian and mutually intelligible, do differ slightly, as is the case with other pluricentric languages (English, Spanish, German and Portuguese, among others), but not to a degree which would justify considering them as different languages. Their structures are grammatically and phonologically almost identical, but have differences in vocabulary and semantics: "Lexical differences between the ethnic variants are extremely limited, even when compared with those between closely related Slavic languages (such as standard Czech and Slovak, Bulgarian and Macedonian), and grammatical differences are even less pronounced. More importantly, complete understanding between the ethnic variants of the standard language makes translation and second language teaching impossible." See Differences between standard Bosnian, Croatian and Serbian.

In 2017, numerous prominent writers, scientists, journalists, activists and other public figures from Croatia, Bosnia-Herzegovina, Montenegro and Serbia signed the Declaration on the Common Language, which states that in Croatia, Serbia, Bosnia-Herzegovina and Montenegro a common polycentric standard language is used, consisting of several standard varieties, similar to the situation in German, English, or Spanish.

See also
 Abstand and ausbau languages
 Declaration on the Common Language 2017
 Language secessionism in Serbo-Croatian
 pluricentric language
 Mutual intelligibility

Notes

References
 
 
 
 
 
 
  Inhaltsverzeichnis.

Further reading
 
  (COBISS-Sr).
 
 
  (ÖNB).
  (ÖNB).
 
 
 Peco, Asim (1967). "Uticaj turskog jezika na fonetiku štokavskih govora". Naš jezik, 16, 3.

External links
 Map of Serbo-Croatian dialects according to Brabec, Kraste, and Živković

Serbo-Croatian language
Dialects of Serbo-Croatian